Robert Humpston VC (1832 – 22 December 1884) was an English recipient of the Victoria Cross, the highest and most prestigious award for gallantry in the face of the enemy that can be awarded to British and Commonwealth forces.

Humpston was about 23 years old, and a private in the 2nd Battalion, The Rifle Brigade (Prince Consort's Own), British Army during the Crimean War when the following deed took place for which he was awarded the VC.

On 22 April 1855 in the Crimea Private Humpston and Private Joseph Bradshaw, on their own, attacked and captured a Russian rifle pit situated among the rocks overhanging the Woronzoff Road. The pit was occupied every night by the Russians and its capture and subsequent destruction was of great importance.

His Victoria Cross is displayed at the Royal Green Jackets (Rifles) Museum at Winchester in England.

Following his death in 1884 Robert Humpston was buried in a pauper's grave.  In September 2007, following a two-year campaign to raise £1,200 to get a headstone for Pte Humpston, his grave was dedicated in a ceremony at Nottingham Cemetery.

References

External links
Location of grave and VC medal (Nottinghamshire)
 

1832 births
1884 deaths
Military personnel from Derbyshire
Burials in Nottinghamshire
People from Derby
Rifle Brigade soldiers
British recipients of the Victoria Cross
Crimean War recipients of the Victoria Cross
British Army personnel of the Crimean War
British military personnel of the Indian Rebellion of 1857
British Army recipients of the Victoria Cross